Corners is a BBC children's television series of the 1980s. Produced by Alison Stewart, the format of the programme was that viewers would submit questions and queries (usually general knowledge, but sometimes metaphysical or scientific), and the two hosts, Tracy Brabin (later Sophie Aldred and then Diane-Louise Jordan) and Simon Davies, would try to answer the questions, aided by an anthopomorphised animal puppet, Jo Corner, who was performed and puppeteered by Robin Stevens (who later performed as Tom on Ragdoll's Tots TV). Being children's programming, the explanations used humour to convey information and frequently involved demonstrations which degenerated into slapstick humour.  Songs were also used.  A show with a similar format, "Dear Mr. Barker", aired on CBBC in the mid-1990s, but did not last long.

One of the presenters of the show was Sophie Aldred, who later became famous for playing the role of Ace in the television series Doctor Who (in one segment prior to her involvement in Who, Aldred met Keff McCulloch to discover how the new Doctor Who theme tune was composed). The other was Simon Davies, whose career continues as a writer and performer.

References

External links 

Corners at BFI

1987 British television series debuts
1991 British television series endings
BBC children's television shows
British television shows featuring puppetry
English-language television shows